The 2008 World Fencing Championships were held at the Olympic Green Convention Center in Beijing, China. The event took place from April 18 to April 20, 2008. It had men's team foil and women's team épée, both of which were not held at the 2008 Summer Olympics.

Medal summary

Medal table

See also 
 Fencing at the 2008 Summer Olympics

World Fencing Championships
W
Fencing Championships
Fencing Championships
Sports competitions in Beijing
2000s in Beijing
April 2008 sports events in Asia